Pattern maker  or patternmaker may refer to:

 Someone who makes patterns for casting
 Patternmaker (clothing)
 Patternmaker (engineering)